Diasporus ventrimaculatus is a species of dink frogs, in the genus Diasporus. It was originally described as Diasporus ventrimaculatus sp. nov. in Zootaxa in 2009.

References 

Diasporus
Amphibians of Costa Rica
Frogs of South America
Amphibians described in 2009
Vulnerable animals